The Fort McMurray Knights RFC was founded in 1974 and is based in Fort McMurray, Alberta. The club competes in the Edmonton Rugby Union. The club runs a number of rugby teams, a men's and women's team, as well as a junior program.

Official website
 Facebook.com/KnightsRugby
 www.knightsrugby.org

Rugby union teams in Alberta
Rugby clubs established in 1974
Fort McMurray
1974 establishments in Alberta